Betty Blue (August 14, 1931 – August 23, 2000) was an American model and actress and was Playboy magazine's Playmate of the Month for the November 1956 issue. Her centerfold was photographed by Hal Adams.

A self-described nudist, Blue was a showgirl at the El Rancho Hotel and Casino in Las Vegas before becoming a Playmate, and posed for other men's magazines before and after joining the Playboy family. She also did additional nude photo shoots for Playboy, usually anonymously, and can be seen in a mid-1990s topless shot in The Playmate Book.

Blue had a limited acting career, mostly in TV commercials and some B-movies.

From 1957 to 1963, Blue was married to producer and director Harold Lime. They remarried in 1991.

Upon her death from heart failure, her ashes were sprinkled on the grounds of the Playboy Mansion.

Filmography
 Women in Revolt (1971) (as Baby Betty) .... Betty
 Not Tonight Henry (1961) .... Pocahontas

See also
 List of people in Playboy 1953–1959

References

External links
 
 

1931 births
2000 deaths
1950s Playboy Playmates
People from West Memphis, Arkansas